A carriage house, also called a remise or coach house, is an outbuilding which was originally built to house horse-drawn carriages and the related tack.

In Great Britain the farm building was called a cart shed.  These typically were open fronted, single story buildings, with the roof supported by regularly spaced pillars.
They often face away from the farmyard and may be found close to the stables and roadways, giving direct access to the fields.

Current usages 
In modern usage, the term "carriage house" has taken on several additional, somewhat overlapping meanings:

 Buildings that were originally true carriage houses that have been converted to other uses such as secondary suites, apartments, guest houses, automobile garages, offices, workshops, retail shops, bars, restaurants, or storage buildings.
 Purpose-built secondary homes, also called accessory dwelling units or detached dwelling units, on the same lot as a primary residence. They have completely separate living areas and facilities, sometimes in the style of converted carriage houses. Some municipalities, such as Ottawa, Ontario, Canada, have introduced regulations permitting coach houses to intensify use of urban residential space and increase affordability and possibilities for multi-generational housing in low-density areas, whereas the state of California revised state laws to limit local governments' authority to restrict ADU construction and reduce cost and bureaucracy hurdles in order to ease the shortage of housing.

 A marketing term for single-family homes, built on a lot just large enough for the home, and often sharing in common land with other homes in the same planned unit development. They are more properly called "carriage homes" or "patio homes". Some municipalities have relaxed setback restrictions for such buildings or allow "zero lot line" carriage homes, in which a wall of the home lies on the property line itself.

Designs 
Carriage houses for small, city houses could be small, utilitarian, and only adequate to house one small carriage.  However, carriage houses for large estates could be quite elaborate and large enough to house many carriages, horses, tack, and hay.  They could even include basic living quarters for the staff who managed the horses and carriages.  Horses were occasionally stabled in the carriage house but usually in a separate barn or stable.

Other modern uses 
Because of the prestigious nature of some large, elaborate carriage houses, the term "Carriage House" is commonly used as part of the name of businesses such as antique shops and restaurants.  Sometimes these businesses are housed in former carriage houses. Property developers are now including coach houses in their portfolios. The unique architectural features and a great parking solution make it an attractive offering to many clients.

See also 
Charles O. Boynton Carriage House
Ladd Carriage House
Pfeiffer House and Carriage House
John G. and Minnie Gluek House and Carriage House
Accessory dwelling unit

References

External links

 https://web.archive.org/web/20120620001747/http://www.remise.de/Classic-Remise-Meilenwerk-Berlin-english-summary.php